The following is a list of female American football teams:

See also 
International Federation of American Football (IFAF), international governing body for American football
European Federation of American Football (EFAF)
Women's Football in the United States
British American Football Association (BAFA)
Association of Professional Football Leagues – compact of NFL and three minor leagues, 1946–1948
List of professional sports leagues#Football: American and Canadian
American-style football quarterback leaderboard
List of female American football players
List of American and Canadian football leagues

References

American football teams
American football-related lists